Lee Hae-Jung (Hangul: 이해정, Hanja: 李海正) is a former South Korean amateur boxer. He is a two-time Asian Games gold medalist.

References

Living people
Asian Games medalists in boxing
Boxers at the 1982 Asian Games
Boxers at the 1986 Asian Games
South Korean male boxers
Asian Games gold medalists for South Korea
Medalists at the 1982 Asian Games
Medalists at the 1986 Asian Games
Year of birth missing (living people)
Light-middleweight boxers